Taishan Station may refer to:

 Taishan Station (Antarctica), Chinese research station
 Taishan metro station, a stop on the Taoyuan Airport MRT, in Taiwan
 Guohua Taishan Power Station, a 5k MW coal-fired power station in Guangdong Province, China

See also
 Taishan railway station (disambiguation)